Read's Cavern is a cave at Burrington Combe, Somerset, England, in which traces of Iron Age occupation have been found. It lies under Dolbury Hill. Its large main chamber has a boulder ruckle floor and is parallel to a cliff face. The cave was excavated by the University of Bristol Spelæological Society (UBSS) in the 1920s, when relics of Iron Age occupation were found.

The UBSS excavation followed the removal of 21 tonnes of limestone material below a cliff where a stream sinks. Among the finds were ironwork described as slave shackles.

After its discovery, the cave was first known as Keltic or Celtic Cavern until the Ordnance Survey decided that it should be known as Read's Cavern, after Mr. R. F. Read, the discoverer. It has also been called "Gough's Cave".

References

Caves of the Mendip Hills
Limestone caves
Wild caves